The 2017–18 Atlantic 10 Conference men's basketball season was the 42nd season of Atlantic 10 Conference basketball. The season began with practices in October 2017, followed by the start of the 2017–18 NCAA Division I men's basketball season in November. League play began in late December and ended on March 3, 2018.

With a win over La Salle on February 20, 2018, Rhode Island clinched at least a share of the A-10 regular season championship, their first title since 1981. Three days later, the Rams clinched an outright A-10 title for the first time in school history.

The 2018 A-10 tournament was held at the Capital One Arena in Washington, D.C. from March 7 through 11, 2018. Davidson defeated Rhode Island in the championship game to win the tournament and receive the conference's automatic bid to the NCAA tournament.

Davidson, Rhode Island, and St. Bonaventure were invited to the NCAA tournament. The schools went a combined 2–3 in tournament play.

Head coaches

Coaching changes 
George Washington head coach Mike Lonergan was fired on September 17, 2016, after the school concluded a two-month investigation into alleged emotional abuse against his players. Maurice Joseph was named interim head coach on September 27. On March 27, 2017, the school removed the interim tag and named Maurice Joseph full-time head coach.

On March 9, 2017, UMass fired head coach Derek Kellogg after nine years and a 155–137 record. On March 31, the school announced they had hired Chattanooga head coach Matt McCall.

Will Wade left VCU to take the head coaching position at LSU following the firing of Johnny Jones. On March 21, 2017 the school hired Rice head coach Mike Rhoades, who had served as associate head coach under Shaka Smart from 2009–2014.

Duquesne fired head coach Jim Ferry on March 13, 2017 after five seasons. The school then hired Akron head coach Keith Dambrot on March 28. Dambrot had a 305-139 record in his 13 years as the Akron head coach.

On March 25, 2017, Dayton head coach Archie Miller left the school to accept the head coaching position at Indiana. The school hired Dayton alum Anthony Grant as the new head coach on March 30.

Coaches 

Notes:
 All records, appearances, titles, etc. are from time with current school only.
 Overall and A-10 records are from time at current school and include the 2017–18 season.

Preseason

Preseason poll 
Prior to the season at the conference's annual media day, awards and a poll were chosen by a panel of the league's head coaches and select media members.

Preseason All-Conference Teams

Regular season

Early season tournaments

Conference matrix 
This table summarizes the head-to-head results between teams in conference play. Each team played 18 conference games: one game vs. eight opponents and two games against five opponents.

Conference Awards 
On March 6, 2018, the Atlantic 10 announced its conference awards.

Postseason

2018 A-10 tournament

* denotes overtime period

NCAA tournament

The winner of the Atlantic 10 tournament, Davidson, received the conference's automatic bid to the 2018 NCAA Division I men's basketball tournament. Two other conference school received at-large bids to the Tournament: Rhode Island and St. Bonaventure.

References